Beaumont-en-Véron is a commune in the Indre-et-Loire department in central France. Since 2016, the castle has been home to Pontourny, the first deradicalisation centre for young people in France. By 2017, the centre was empty but remained open.

Population

See also
Communes of the Indre-et-Loire department

References

Communes of Indre-et-Loire